Józef Bednarski (born January 21, 1941) is a Polish former professional wrestler and bodybuilder, best known by the ring name Ivan Putski. He was given the nicknames "The Polish Hammer" and "Polish Power".

Putski is a former WWF World Tag Team Champion with Tito Santana. He had a famous feud with Superstar Billy Graham over the WWF Championship, which led to many pose-downs, arm wrestling bouts, and long matches between the two. Other rivals included The Iron Sheik, Ivan Koloff, and Jesse Ventura, who would refer to Putski as "Puduski" when commentating for the WWF. Putski was the first Polish wrestler to perform in the WWF (now WWE).

Early life
Putski was born in Kraków and migrated to the United States at a young age. He and his family arrived in Texas, where Putski began his professional wrestling career. He stood 5 ft 6 in and weighed around 225 lbs. In his earlier days, he was weighed in at the 250 lb mark.

Professional wrestling

Early career (1968–1974)
Putski won the NWA Texas Tag Team Championship with José Lothario twice in 1973.

Putski was a fixture on the Dallas-Ft. Worth wrestling scene and was one of its most popular personalities. He was routinely the feature act at the Sportatorium, a wrestling-only arena in an industrial section near Downtown Dallas. Putski's act consisted of being a happy-go-lucky, often aloof buffoon, who would "miraculously" pin his opponent.  Putski was often introduced as a former concentration camp survivor, only adding to his sympathetic appeal to audiences of all ages.

In mid-1974, Putski worked with the American Wrestling Association. It his time in the AWA that Putski also first clashed with Superstar Billy Graham.

Prior to leaving the AWA, Ivan dropped most of his weight by getting into bodybuilding.  Ivan kept himself fairly trim at the 215–220 pound mark.

World (Wide) Wrestling Federation (1974–1987)

Putski debuted in the World Wide Wrestling Federation (WWWF) in 1974. While in the WWWF, Putski feuded with many wrestlers, including Bruiser Brody, Stan Hansen and Ivan Koloff. On June 25, 1976 at Showdown at Shea, Putski defeated Baron Mikel Scicluna. Four years later on August 9, Putski was again victorious at the next Showdown at Shea, defeating Johnny Rodz. He also resumed his feud with Superstar Billy Graham. On October 22, 1979, Putski teamed with a young rookie Tito Santana to defeat Johnny and Jerry Valiant to win the WWF World Tag Team Championship. They held the title for six months before losing it to The Wild Samoans. Putski worked in the renamed World Wrestling Federation (WWF) in the 1980s, primarily feuding with Roddy Piper and Sgt. Slaughter. He took a hiatus from wrestling in 1986. He soon returned to the independent circuit, also making occasional appearances in the WWF as a jobber to the stars. His last high-profile feud was in 1984 with Jesse Ventura. His final appearance was in 1987 teaming on television with Junkyard Dog and Superstar Billy Graham in tag team matches. He then retired from the sport.

Other promotions (1981–1986)
He began to slow down his career in the 1980s. He won his last tag team championship in May 1981, teaming with Wahoo McDaniel to defeat Dory Funk, Jr. and Larry Lane for the SWCW World Tag Team Championship. In November 1985, Randy Savage defeated Ivan Putski in the opening round of the Wrestling Classic.

Return to Wrestling (1991–1992)
After his run in the WWF, several promotions, and his semi-retirement, Putski returned to the ring in 1991. Putski  made an appearance for International World Class Championship Wrestling teaming with his son, Scott to defeat the Masked Iraqis. Also made an appearance for Global Wrestling Federation in 1992 teaming with Gary Young against Tom and Mike Davis in a no contest.

Return to WWF (1995, 1997)
In 1995, Putski was inducted into the WWF Hall of Fame class of 1995 by his son, Scott. The father-and-son team returned in July 1997 to defeat Jerry Lawler and Brian Christopher on Raw is War, in what would be Putski's final match.

International Championship Wrestling (1996)
In 1996, he joined International Championship Wrestling, as a face. He won several matches in the company, and he was billed as a tough guy.

NWA New Jersey (1999)
Putski wrestled his last match for NWA New Jersey as he defeated King Kong Bundy by disqualification on February 27, 1999.

Retirement

After working for several wrestling promotions, mostly, from the independent circuit, Putski retired from full active competition in the 1990s. After his retirement from wrestling, he had a strongman career. Putski occasionally made appearances in the ring during the years.

In 2010, Putski appeared in a reunion event called "LegendsMania" and he was interviewed.

Strongman career
Aside from wrestling, Ivan Putski also competed as a strongman. He participated in the 1978 World's Strongest Man competition, finishing eighth in a field of ten competitors.

Personal life
Putski's son, Scott Putski, is also a professional wrestler, having previously worked at World Wrestling Federation and World Championship Wrestling. However, Scott did not share the same success that Ivan once had.

From 2000 to 2007, Putski worked as head security guard at Jack C. Hays High School in Buda, Texas.

On January 8, 2012, Ivan Putski was inducted into the Cloverleaf Radio Hall of Fame, Class of 2012.

Championships and accomplishments

Big Time Wrestling
NWA American Tag Team Championship (1 time) – with Jose Lothario
NWA Texas Tag Team Championship (2 times) – with Jose Lothario
Pro Wrestling Illustrated
PWI Tag Team of the Year (1979) with Tito Santana
PWI ranked him #170 of the 500 best singles wrestlers during the "PWI Years" in 2003
PWI ranked him #92 of the 100 best tag teams of the "PWI Years" with Tito Santana in 2003
Southwest Championship Wrestling
SCW World Tag Team Championship (1 time) – with Wahoo McDaniel
World Wrestling Federation
WWF Tag Team Championship (1 time) – with Tito Santana
WWF Hall of Fame (Class of 1995)
Wrestling Observer Newsletter awards
Readers' Least Favorite Wrestler (1984)
Worst Wrestler (1984)

Notes

External links
WWE Hall of Fame profile
Profile at Online World of Wrestling

1941 births
American male professional wrestlers
Living people
Polish emigrants to the United States
Polish professional wrestlers
Polish strength athletes
American bodybuilders
Professional wrestlers from Texas
Professional wrestling trainers
Sportspeople from Kraków
WWE Hall of Fame inductees
20th-century professional wrestlers